This is a list of programs currently and formerly broadcast by Nickelodeon, a Canadian version of the United States cable channel of the same name.

Current programming
As of March 2023:

Programming from Nickelodeon (U.S.)

Live-action series

Animated series ("Nicktoons")

Preschool series

Programming from YTV

Live-action series

Animated series

Programming from Treehouse TV

Animated series

Acquired programming

Live-action series

Animated series

Preschool series

Former programming

Programming from Nickelodeon (U.S.)

Live-action series

Animated series ("Nicktoons")

Preschool series

Programming from YTV

Live-action series

Animated series

Programming from Treehouse TV

Live-action series

Animated series

Acquired programming

Live-action series

Animated series

Preschool series

See also
 List of programs broadcast by YTV
 List of programs broadcast by Treehouse TV

Notes

References

External links
 Nickelodeon

Nickelodeon
Nickelodeon-related lists